Marius Bjugan (born 6 April 1981) is a Norwegian orienteering competitor. He won a gold medal in the middle distance at the 2001 Junior World Orienteering Championships in Miskolc. He represented Norway at the 2008 World Orienteering Championships in Olomouc.

References

External links
 
 

1981 births
Living people
Norwegian orienteers
Male orienteers
Foot orienteers
20th-century Norwegian people
21st-century Norwegian people
Junior World Orienteering Championships medalists